Fischer's little fruit bat (Rhinophylla fischerae) is a bat species found in Brazil, Colombia, Ecuador, Peru and Venezuela.

References

Phyllostomidae
Bats of South America
Bats of Brazil
Mammals of Colombia
Mammals of Ecuador
Mammals of Peru
Mammals of Venezuela
Fauna of the Amazon
Mammals described in 1966